Craig Ellis (born 4 June 1975 in Stawell, Victoria) is a former Australian rules footballer in the Australian Football League.

Football career
He was drafted by North Melbourne as a 15-year-old in the 1990 AFL Draft, but only played for their Under-19 team.  He was drafted again in the 1993 Pre-season Draft by Footscray from the Western Jets and debuted for them in 1994. Early injuries hampered his career but he drastically improved during the 1997 season where he took many saving marks at centre half-back.

In 2002, Ellis moved for one season to the Melbourne Football Club, in which he had a solid year, playing 14 consecutive games, but decided to retire at the end of the season.

Post-football career
After retiring from football, Ellis created the clothing brand St Lenny, located in Prahran Victoria.

The St Lenny brand later failed in the market, and Ellis declared bankruptcy shortly after. Several years later, he co-founded Triangl, a swimwear range. The brand has soared, with profits reaching US$40 million in 2015.

References

External links

Western Bulldogs players
Melbourne Football Club players
Western Jets players
Stawell Football Club players
Australian rules footballers from Victoria (Australia)
1975 births
Living people
People from Stawell, Victoria